Allyson Vieira is an American artist living and working in New York City, New York.  She is primarily known for her sculptural works and drawings.  She was born in Massachusetts in 1979.  Vieira studied art at The Cooper Union for the Advancement of Science and Art, receiving her Bachelor of Fine Arts in 2001, and studied sculpture at the Milton Avery Graduate School of Arts at Bard College, receiving her Master of Fine Arts in 2009.  Vieira is represented by Laurel Gitlen Gallery in New York City. Vieira's drawings were published in Untitled Book (Geometry + Democracy) by Evil Twin Publications.

Solo exhibitions
2010 "Ozymandias," Laurel Gitlen Gallery, New York
2007 "Untitled Book (Geometry + Democracy)," Klaus Von Nichtsaagend Gallery, Brooklyn, NY. Book Release
2006 "Allyson Vieira," Small A Projects, Portland, OR

Selected group exhibitions

2010 "Knight’s Move," SculptureCenter, New York (catalogue)
2010 "Point to one end, which is always present," Laurel Gitlen Gallery, New York 
2009 "Evading Customs," curated by Peter J. Russo and Lumi Tan, Brown Gallery, London, England (pdf catalogue) 
2009 "NOBODIES NEW YORK," curated by Josh Kline, 179 Canal Street, New York
2008 “Champion Zero,” Rental Gallery, New York (catalogue)
2008 “200597214200022008,” Small A Projects, New York
2008 “Cube Passerby 2008” Passerby, Gavin Brown Enterprises. New York
2007 “First Hand Steroids,” Andreas Melas Presents, REmap KM in association with the Athens Biennial, Athens, Greece.
2004 “The Freedom Salon.” Deitch Projects, NY. Group exhibition curated by Tina Kukielski and Apsara DiQuinzio.

References

Artists from New York (state)
Living people
Year of birth missing (living people)